Jabor is a Marshallese town located in Jaluit Atoll.

The population of Jabor is 569. Jabor features a small hotel, small stores that sell staple foods, and a gasoline station. Jabor is a base for commercial and sports fishing, where motorboats can be rented.

Amata Kabua (first president of Marshall Islands) was born in Jabor.

Jabor has two elementary schools: St. Josephs, attached to the Catholic Church, and a public school. There are also elementary schools in Jaluit motu and Iemej. Jaluit High School is a boarding school that serves students from Jaluit Atoll and the southern atolls of Ebon, Ailinglaplap, Namu, Kili, Namdrik and Jabat.

Jaluit Airport is served by Air Marshall Islands.

References

Jaluit Atoll
Populated places in the Marshall Islands